Wayne Perry is a South African international lawn bowler.

Bowls career
In 2006, he won the Hong Kong International Bowls Classic pairs title with Neil Burkett. Two years later, Perry won the bronze medal in the fours with Clinton Roets and Brian Dixon and Billy Radloff at the 2008 World Outdoor Bowls Championship in Christchurch.

In 2009 he won the triples and fours gold medals at the Atlantic Bowls Championships.

He won a gold medal in the Men's triples at the 2010 Commonwealth Games.

In 2011 he won the triples bronze medal at the Atlantic Bowls Championships.

References

Living people
Commonwealth Games gold medallists for South Africa
Bowls players at the 2010 Commonwealth Games
South African male bowls players
Commonwealth Games medallists in lawn bowls
1982 births
Medallists at the 2010 Commonwealth Games